The Beauty That Still Remains is a full-length choral work by Norwegian composer Marcus Paus, that is based on The Diary of a Young Girl by Anne Frank, and has received critical acclaim. It was commissioned by the Government of Norway for the official Norwegian 70th anniversary of the end of the Second World War in 2015, and written for the Norwegian Girls' Choir, historically the girl's choir of the Norwegian Broadcasting Corporation; it premiered in 2015 in the Atrium of the University of Oslo (where the Nobel Peace Prize was formerly awarded), and the premiere was opened by Minister of Defence Ine Marie Eriksen Søreide. It was released on the 2020 studio album The Beauty That Still Remains by the Norwegian Girls' Choir alongside Maja Ratkje's avant-garde choral work Asylos.

Content and reception

The libretto is written by Paus based on Anne Frank's diary and includes edited parts of it. It includes eleven movements: "Prologue: Dearest Kitty," "The World Transformed I", "Cadenza I," "Empty Days," "Cadenza II," "Prescription for Gunfire Jitters," "A Portrait of Anne," "Intimations of Love," "Cadenza III," "The World Transformed II" and "Epilogue: The Beauty That Still Remains."

The work "takes its title from one of the most famous, defiant, and affecting quotes from The Diary of Anne Frank":

Guy Rickards noted in Gramophone:

Album

In 2020 the studio album The Beauty That Still Remains by the Norwegian Girls' Choir was released by 2L; it includes Paus' eponymous work as well as Maja Ratkje's avant-garde choral work Asylos. Music critic Ola Nordal described the work as "a masterpiece." Dominy Clements noted that the album is "filled with intriguing juxtapositions, with children’s songs and games rubbing shoulders with Gregorian chant, spoken word and beautiful singing and all kinds of theatrical scenes being created and as quickly dissolved into jaw-dropping moments of unexpected stylistic and musical counterpoint."

References

Compositions by Marcus Paus
Choral compositions
Cultural depictions of Anne Frank
Songs about the Holocaust
Classical music about the Holocaust
Works based on diaries